Carabus obsoletus prunneri is a subspecies of ground beetle in the subfamily Carabinae that can be found in Hungary and Romania.

References

obsoletus prunneri
Beetles described in 1901